Mohamed Badache born 15 October 1976 in Hussein Dey, Alger) is an Algerian footballer. He last played as a forward for ES Sétif in the Algerian Championnat National.

National team statistics

Honours
 Won the Algerian Cup twice with MC Alger in 2006 and 2007
 Won the Algerian Super Cup twice with MC Alger in 2006 and 2007
 Won the Arab Champions League once with ES Sétif in 2008

References

External links
 

1976 births
Algerian footballers
Living people
Footballers from Algiers
Algeria international footballers
USM Blida players
MC Alger players
ES Sétif players
Kabyle people
Association football forwards
21st-century Algerian people